Vaudreuil can refer to:

Places
Canada
 Vaudreuil-Dorion, a city located west of Montreal, Quebec
 Terrasse-Vaudreuil, Quebec, a small Quebec municipality located near Montreal
 Vaudreuil-Soulanges Regional County Municipality, Quebec
 Vaudreuil-Soulanges (electoral district), a Canadian federal electoral district located in Quebec
 Vaudreuil (provincial electoral district), a Quebec provincial electoral district
France
 Le Vaudreuil, a commune in the Eure department in Haute-Normandie
United States
 Vaudreuil, Wisconsin, an unincorporated community

People
 Pierre François de Rigaud, Marquis de Vaudreuil-Cavagnal (1698–1778), a Canadian colonial governor
 Philippe de Rigaud Vaudreuil (1643–1725), Governor General of New France (Canada)
 Louis-Philippe de Vaudreuil (1724–1802), Member of the French Navy
 Joseph Hyacinth Francois de Paule de Rigaud, Comte de Vaudreuil (1740–1817)

Others
 Les Mustangs de Vaudreuil, a Junior hockey based in Vaudreuil-Dorion, Quebec